Sebastià Alzamora i Martín (Llucmajor, Majorca, March 6, 1972) is a writer, literary critic and cultural manager from Majorca. Self-proclaimed member of the poetic group called Imparables ("Unstoppable")

Biography
Sebastià has a degree in Catalan philology from Universitat de les Illes Balears, and became known with collection of poems Rafel (1994; Premi Salvador Espriu). He has also published Apoteosi del cercle (1997), Mula morta (2001) and El benestar (2003).

As a writer, he has published L'extinció (1999), Sara i Jeremies (2002), La pell i la princesa (2005), Nit de l'ànima (2007), Miracle a Llucmajor (2010) and Dos amics de vint anys (2013). He is the author of the essay about Gabriel Janer Manila L'escriptura del Foc (1998). He also participated in Imparables, Una antologia (2004) and he has published with Hèctor Bofill and Manuel Forcano Dogmàtica Imparable (2005). His novel Crim de sang has been published in English "Blood Crime" (SohoPress, 2016)

As a columnist, he writes in Catalan language newspapers Avui and Ara. Since December 2007, he is the director of the magazine "Cultura".

Awards 
 1994: Award Salvador Espriu by Rafel
 1996: Award Bartomeu Rosselló-Pòrcel of Premis 31 de Desembre from Obra Cultural Balear.
 1999: Award Documenta de narrativa
 2002: Award Ciutat de Palma de novel·la by Sara i Jeremies
 2003: Award Jocs Florals de Barcelona by El Benestar
 2005: Award Josep Pla de narrativa by La pell i la princesa
 2008: Award Carles Riba de poesia by La part visible
 2011: Award Sant Jordi de novel·la, by Crim de sang

References

External links 
 The author at the web page of the Associació d'Escriptors en Llengua Catalana
 Information about the author 
 

Catalan-language writers
Catalan-language poets
1972 births
Living people